Sultana Nadira is a Bangladeshi politician who was elected as Member of 11th Jatiya Sangsad of Reserved Seats for Women. She is a politician of Bangladesh Awami League. Her late husband Golam Sabur Tulu was an MP from Barguna-2.

References

Living people
Awami League politicians
11th Jatiya Sangsad members
People from Barguna district
Year of birth missing (living people)
21st-century Bangladeshi women politicians
Women members of the Jatiya Sangsad